Luis Avendaño (born 29 November 1992) is a Venezuelan Greco-Roman wrestler. He won the gold medal in the men's 87kg event at the 2019 Pan American Games in Lima, Peru and the 2022 South American Games in Asunción, Paraguay. He is also a two-time gold medalist at the Pan American Wrestling Championships.

Career 

He won the silver medal at the 2018 Central American and Caribbean Games held in Barranquilla, Colombia in the men's 77 kg event.

At the 2019 Pan American Wrestling Championships held in Buenos Aires, Argentina, he won the gold medal in the men's 87 kg event. In 2018, he won the gold medal in the men's 82 kg event at the Pan American Wrestling Championships held in Lima, Peru.

At the 2019 Pan American Games held in Lima, Peru, he won the gold medal in the men's 87 kg event. In the final, he defeated Alfonso Leyva of Mexico.

In March 2020, he competed at the Pan American Olympic Qualification Tournament in Ottawa, Canada without qualifying for the 2020 Summer Olympics in Tokyo, Japan. In May 2021, he also failed to qualify for the Olympics at the World Olympic Qualification Tournament held in Sofia, Bulgaria.

He won the silver medal in his event at the 2022 Bolivarian Games held in Valledupar, Colombia. He won the gold medal in his event at the 2022 South American Games held in Asunción, Paraguay.

Achievements

References

External links 
 

Living people
1992 births
Place of birth missing (living people)
Venezuelan male sport wrestlers
Wrestlers at the 2015 Pan American Games
Wrestlers at the 2019 Pan American Games
Medalists at the 2019 Pan American Games
Pan American Games gold medalists for Venezuela
Pan American Games medalists in wrestling
Central American and Caribbean Games silver medalists for Venezuela
Competitors at the 2018 Central American and Caribbean Games
Central American and Caribbean Games medalists in wrestling
Pan American Wrestling Championships medalists
South American Games medalists in wrestling
South American Games gold medalists for Venezuela
South American Games silver medalists for Venezuela
Competitors at the 2018 South American Games
Competitors at the 2022 South American Games
21st-century Venezuelan people